Roman Romanovych Vantukh (born 4 July 1998) is a Ukrainian professional football player who plays as a left-back for Zorya Luhansk .

Club career
He made his Ukrainian Premier League debut for Olimpik Donetsk on 23 February 2019 in a game against Mariupol.

References

External links
 
 

1998 births
Sportspeople from Lviv
Living people
Ukrainian footballers
Ukraine youth international footballers
Ukraine under-21 international footballers
Association football defenders
FC Dynamo Kyiv players
FC Olimpik Donetsk players
FC Oleksandriya players
FC Chornomorets Odesa players
SC Dnipro-1 players
FC Zorya Luhansk players
Ukrainian Premier League players